Chondrorhyncha is a genus of flowering plants from the orchid family, Orchidaceae. At the present time 7 species are recognized, though many more names have been proposed. All species are native to Colombia, Venezuela and Ecuador.

Chondrorhyncha hirtzii Dodson - Ecuador 
Chondrorhyncha inedita Dressler & Dalström - Colombia
Chondrorhyncha macronyx Kraenzl. - Colombia
Chondrorhyncha panguensis Dodson ex P.A.Harding - Ecuador 
Chondrorhyncha rosea Lindl. - Colombia, Venezuela 
Chondrorhyncha suarezii Dodson - Ecuador 
Chondrorhyncha velastiguii Dodson - Ecuador

See also 
 List of Orchidaceae genera

References 

 Pridgeon, A.M., Cribb, P.J., Chase, M.A. & Rasmussen, F. eds. (1999). Genera Orchidacearum 1. Oxford Univ. Press.
 Pridgeon, A.M., Cribb, P.J., Chase, M.A. & Rasmussen, F. eds. (2001). Genera Orchidacearum 2. Oxford Univ. Press.
 Pridgeon, A.M., Cribb, P.J., Chase, M.A. & Rasmussen, F. eds. (2003). Genera Orchidacearum 3. Oxford Univ. Press
 Berg Pana, H. 2005. Handbuch der Orchideen-Namen. Dictionary of Orchid Names. Dizionario dei nomi delle orchidee. Ulmer, Stuttgart

External links 

Orchids of South America
Zygopetalinae genera
Zygopetalinae